Sean Noel Walker is a New Zealand visual effects artist. He was nominated for an Academy Award in the category Best Visual Effects for the film Shang-Chi and the Legend of the Ten Rings.

Selected filmography 
 Shang-Chi and the Legend of the Ten Rings (2021; co-nominated with Christopher Townsend, Joe Farrell and Dan Oliver)

References

External links 

Living people
Place of birth missing (living people)
Year of birth missing (living people)
Visual effects artists
Visual effects supervisors